The 1983–84 North Carolina Tar Heels men's basketball team represented University of North Carolina in the 1983-84 NCAA Division I men's basketball season as a member of the Atlantic Coast Conference. They finished the season 28-3 overall, won the ACC regular season title with a 14-0 record and made it to the Sweet Sixteen of the 1984 NCAA tournament. They were coached by Dean Smith in his twenty-third season as head coach of the Tar Heels. They played their home games at the Carmichael Auditorium in Chapel Hill, North Carolina.

Season Summary
Returning seniors Sam Perkins and Matt Doherty, junior Michael Jordan, and sophomore Brad Daugherty, the Tar Heels were ranked #1 in the AP poll and #2 in the Coaches' Poll to start the season.

On Saturday, November 3 coach Dean Smith recorded his 500th career victory with an 88-75 win at Stanford.  On Wednesday, January 25 UNC recorded its largest margin of victory in the history of its rivalry with Wake Forest, trouncing Wake Forest 100-63.  Except for the second week of the season, North Carolina was ranked #1 in the AP Poll for the entire season. The Tar Heels were 16-0 and dominating other teams, when their point guard, freshman Kenny Smith, was injured. He broke his wrist after being taken down on a break-away against #10 LSU on January 29, 1984. Although North Carolina won the game 90-79, the team's chemistry was disrupted. The Tar Heels won their next four games to reach 21-0 but lost on February 12, 1984, at 19th ranked (UPI) Arkansas 65-64. They won their last five games, including a memorable season-ending game over Duke (see below), to finish the regular season 26-1 and 14-0 in the Atlantic Coast Conference.

Although Kenny Smith returned with a cast on his arm against Duke, the Tar Heels' season ended on a flat note. After beating Clemson in the opening round of the ACC Tournament, North Carolina lost to Duke 77-75 (see below) in the semi-finals of the tournament. Despite the loss, the Tar Heels retained their #1 ranking and received a #1 seed in the East Regional of the NCAA tournament. They received a first-round bye and defeated #8-seed Temple 77-66 in the second round. However, their season ended in disappointment in the East Regional semi-finals with a 72-68 loss to #4-seed Indiana.

Dean Smith often said that the 1983-84 Tar Heels' team was one of the few teams he coached that he felt was the best team in the country. Although freshman Kenny Smith was overshadowed by other teammates on this team, his mid-season injury may have prevented the Tar Heels, and stars Michael Jordan and Sam Perkins, from winning their second national championship in three years.

North Carolina played two notable games against Duke in 1984:

March 3, 1984: #1 North Carolina 96, Duke 83 (2OT)
The final home game for Matt Doherty, Michael Jordan, and Sam Perkins, was a memorable one for Tar Heels fans.  North Carolina looked to be finished when Duke's Mark Alarie converted a three-point play with 20 second to go in regulation and the Tar Heels missed a jumper that would have tied the game.  However, after the Blue Devils missed the front end of a one-and-one, Matt Doherty took the inbounds pass the length of the court and hit a 15-footer with one second remaining to force overtime.  The teams traded baskets during the first overtime and headed for the second extra session tied at 79.  Michael Jordan opened the second overtime with an ally oop and a free throw, but Johnny Dawkins cut the North Carolina lead to 82–81 with a short jumper.  Duke would get only one more basket as Jordan and Sam Perkins carried the Tar Heels to the 96–83 final, and North Carolina became the first ACC team in 10 years to go undefeated in conference play (14–0).  Alarie led all scorers with 28 points, while Jordan topped Carolina with 25.
March 10, 1984: #16 Duke 77, #1 North Carolina 75
After losing two close games to North Carolina in the regular season, Duke finally upset the Tar Heels in the semifinals of the ACC Tournament.  Johnny Dawkins and Tommy Amaker led the Blue Devils to a 40–32 halftime advantage.  Nevertheless, North Carolina went on a 12–2 run to open the second half, tying the score at 44–44 in a game that was close the rest of the way.  David Henderson hit four late free throws to keep Duke in the lead, but Michael Jordan closed the gap to 77–75.  North Carolina regained possession with three seconds left in the game, but the Tar Heels comeback bid ended with Matt Doherty's errant inbounds pass.  Jordan led all scorers with 22 points, while Doherty scored 20 and grabbed 10 rebounds.

Roster

Source: Tar Heel Times

Player stats

Schedule and results

|-
!colspan=12 style=| Regular season

|-
!colspan=12 style=| ACC Tournament

|-
!colspan=12 style=| NCAA Tournament

Rankings

Awards and honors
 Michael Jordan, ACC Player of the Year
 Michael Jordan, Adolph Rupp Trophy
 Michael Jordan, Naismith College Player of the Year
 Michael Jordan, USBWA College Player of the Year
 Michael Jordan, John R. Wooden Award

Team players drafted into the NBA

References

North Carolina
North Carolina Tar Heels men's basketball seasons
North Carolina
Tar
Tar